Kvenvær is a former municipality in the old Sør-Trøndelag county, Norway. The  municipality existed from 1913 until 1964. It is located in what is now the municipality of Hitra in Trøndelag county. The municipality included the western part of the island of Hitra plus many surrounding islands including Bispøyan. The administrative centre of the municipality was the village of Kvenvær where Kvenvær Church is located. Other villages in Kvenvær municipality included Forsnes and Andersskogan.

History

The municipality of Kvenvær was established on 1 January 1913 when the municipality of Hitra was divided with the western part of the municipality (population: 1,157) becoming the new municipality of Kvenvær. During the 1960s, there were many municipal mergers across Norway due to the work of the Schei Committee. On 1 January 1964, the municipalities of Kvenvær (population: 840), Hitra (population: 1,344), Sandstad (population: 1,028), and Fillan (population: 1,759) were merged to form a new, larger municipality of Hitra.

Name
The municipality is named Kvenvær since the first Kvenvær Church was built there.

Government
While it existed, this municipality was responsible for primary education (through 10th grade), outpatient health services, senior citizen services, unemployment, social services, zoning, economic development, and municipal roads. During its existence, this municipality was governed by a municipal council of elected representatives, which in turn elected a mayor.

Municipal council
The municipal council  of Kvenvær was made up of representatives that were elected to four year terms. The party breakdown of the final municipal council was as follows:

Mayors
The mayors of Kvenvær:

 1913–1913: Kristian Skarsvåg
 1914–1916: Anders Presthus
 1917–1922: Johannes Forsnes (H)
 1923–1925: John I. Ottervik
 1926–1928: Johannes Forsnes (H)
 1929–1931: Jens Grimstad (V)
 1932–1937: Johannes Forsnes (H)
 1938–1945: Jens Grimstad (V)
 1946–1961: Martin Skaaren (H)
 1962–1963: Bjarne Faxvaag (H)

See also
List of former municipalities of Norway

References

Hitra
Former municipalities of Norway
1913 establishments in Norway
1964 disestablishments in Norway